Abdelhakim Belabed (born 1964) is the Algerian Minister of National Education. He was appointed as minister on 31 March 2019.

Education 
Belabed holds a Bachelor in Informatics (1988).

References 

1964 births
Living people
21st-century Algerian politicians
Algerian politicians
Government ministers of Algeria

Education ministers of Algeria